The Owen was a brass era luxury automobile built in Detroit, Michigan by the Owen Motor Car Company from 1910 to 1912.

History 
The Owen  designed by Ralph Owen was a luxury automobile with a 50-hp,  four-cylinder engine.  It had progressive features such as left-hand steering, a central gear change, and was placed on a lowered chassis with 42-inch tires, which gave it a similar appearance to the Oldsmobile Limited.  The touring car style sold for $3,200 while the limousine cost $4,800, .

Ralph Owen contracted with his brothers Raymond M. Owen to market the car through the R. M. Owen & Company. The company were dealers for the Reo Motor Car, and Reo decided to purchase the Owen Motor Car Company.  Reo finished constructing 35 Owen automobiles and then closed the company.  The Owen factory was sold to the Krit Motor Car Company.

In 1912, Ralph Owen began work on a new car that would become the Owen Magnetic.

Advertisements

References 

Defunct motor vehicle manufacturers of the United States
Motor vehicle manufacturers based in Michigan
Defunct manufacturing companies based in Michigan
Brass Era vehicles
1910s cars
Luxury vehicles
Luxury motor vehicle manufacturers